The 2015–16 FA Women's Premier League Plate is the second running of the competition, which began in 2014. It is the secondary League Cup competition run by the FA Women's Premier League (FA WPL), and is run in parallel with the league's primary League Cup competition, the Premier League Cup.

The teams that take part in the WPL plate are decided after the first qualifying round of the WPL Cup, known as the Determining Round. The winners of Determining Round matches continue in the WPL Cup, while the losers move into the WPL Plate.

All 72 Premier League clubs were included in the Determining round draw, three of whom (Gloucester City, Swindon Spitfires and Wolverhampton Wanderers) withdrew from the competition before playing a match, meaning 36 teams progressed in the Cup and 33 were entered in the Plate.

Reigning champions Preston North End, who beat Huddersfield Town 3–0 in the 2014–15 final, won their Determining Round match this season, meaning that they did not defend their title.

Results
Note: All results from The Football Association

Preliminary round
Due to there being 33 teams in the competition, a single preliminary round match was required to eliminate one team and allow a full single-elimination knockout tournament to take place.

First round

Second round

Quarter-finals

Semi-finals

Final

References

FA Women's National League Plate
Prem